Achalpur Assembly constituency is one of the 288 constituencies of Maharashtra Vidhan Sabha and one of the eight which are located in Amravati district.

It is a part of Amravati (Lok Sabha constituency) along with five other Vidhan Sabha assembly constituencies viz. Badnera, Amravati, Teosa, Daryapur (SC) and Melghat (ST) .

As per orders of Delimitation of Parliamentary and Assembly constituencies Order, 2008, No. 42 Achalpur Assembly constituency is composed of the following: 
1. Chandurbazar Tehsil, 2. Achalpur Tehsil (Part), Revenue Circle-Shirajgaon Kasba, Achalpur and Achalpur (MC) of the district.

In 2019, Mr Bachchu Kadu is elected as MLA from Achalpur.

Members of Vidhan Sabha

Election results

Assembly Elections 2004

Assembly Elections 2009

Assembly Elections 2014

See also
 Achalpur
 List of constituencies of Maharashtra Legislative Assembly

References

Assembly constituencies of Maharashtra